American supercentenarians are citizens or residents of the United States who have attained or surpassed 110 years of age. , the Gerontology Research Group (GRG) had validated the longevity claims of 782 American supercentenarians. The oldest American resident is listed as Edie Ceccarelli (born in Willits, California, on February 5, 1908), aged . The longest-lived person ever from the United States is Sarah Knauss, of Hollywood, Luzerne County, Pennsylvania, who died on December 30, 1999, aged 119 years and 97 days.

100 oldest known Americans 
Below is a list of the 100 longest lived American supercentenarians according to the GRG and reliable sourcing.

Biographies

Ann Pouder 

Born in London, she emigrated with her family to the United States at the age of 12, settling in Baltimore, Maryland, where she lived for the remainder of her life. She married Alexander Pouder, though she became a widow very early and had no children. Her extreme longevity claim was certified by Alexander Graham Bell. She was bedridden, blind and almost deaf in her last few months, but her mind remained sharp.

Mary Bidwell 
Mary Electa Bidwell (May 9, 1881 – April 25, 1996) was an American supercentenarian. She died aged 114 years and 352 days and is the oldest person on record ever to die in Connecticut.

Her parents were Charles Woodruff Bidwell and Alice Beach Nobel. She was a descendant of John Bidwell, one of the founders of Hartford, Connecticut. Bidwell worked as a teacher in a one-room schoolhouse for six years. She married Charles Hubbell Bidwell, a distant cousin, in 1906. Bidwell lived on her own in North Haven, Connecticut, until she was 110. Bidwell died at the Arden House, a nursing home in Hamden, Connecticut.

Maggie Barnes 
Maggie Pauline Barnes (née Hinnant; March 6, 1882 – January 19, 1998) was an American supercentenarian. She was born to a former slave and married a tenant farmer. Barnes died on January 19, 1998, in Johnston County, North Carolina, of gangrene. She was survived by four of her fifteen children.

Her exact year of birth has been disputed. Though the year 1882 is written in her family bible, the 1900 US Census records her birth year as 1881 and her marriage license claims that she was born in 1880. Authenticating to what was put on the family Bible, Barnes lived for 115 years and 319 days.

Adelina Domingues 
Adelina Domingues (February 19, 1888 – August 21, 2002) was a Cape Verdean American supercentenarian who was the world's oldest person from the May 28, 2002, death of fellow 114-year-old British born, American woman Grace Clawson, until her own death less than three months later. Domingues was born in Cape Verde. Domingues's Italian father was a harbor pilot by profession, and her mother was Portuguese by ethnicity. She married a ship captain in 1907, and moved to the United States that year. Her husband died from cancer in 1950. Domingues was a missionary from the Church of the Nazarene in Cape Verde and other parts of Africa, and also a religious preacher when she lived in Massachusetts, as well as an expert seamstress.

Domingues was a firm believer in the American Dream, was deeply religious, had conservative political views and was a pen pal of former President of the United States Ronald Reagan. She had four children, but only one of them (a son, Frank) reached adulthood. Frank died in 1998 at the age of 71, with Adelina outliving him by four years. Domingues died at a nursing home in the San Diego, California, area on August 21, 2002, at age 114 years and 183 days. She had claimed she was actually one year older, or 115 years old, but her family and Cape Verdean diplomats did some research and discovered her baptismal information, from which they concluded that Domingues was 114 years old when she died.

Charlotte Benkner 
Charlotte Benkner (née Enterlein; November 16, 1889 – May 14, 2004) was an American supercentenarian and considered the world's oldest person from 2003 to 2004. Subsequent recognition of other supercentenarians ranked Benkner as the third oldest at the time of her death.

Benkner was born in Leipzig, Germany, and emigrated to the U.S. in 1896. She grew up in Peekskill, New York, where her family ran the Albert Hotel, and as a young woman once met then U.S. President   Theodore Roosevelt. After her 1908 marriage to Karl Benkner, she moved west, living in Pennsylvania and Ohio, before retiring to Arizona. Already a supercentenarian and the oldest person in Arizona, Benkner returned to Ohio to live in North Lima with her sister Tillie O'Hare, her youngest sibling. Tillie died in January 2004, just three weeks shy of becoming a centenarian. Benkner survived her sister by only four months, and died at age 114 years and 180 days, after a brief hospital stay in Youngstown, Ohio.

Emma Verona Johnston 
Emma Verona Johnston (née Calhoun; August 6, 1890 – December 1, 2004) was an American supercentenarian who was born in Indianola, Iowa, to a large family. She graduated from Drake University in the Class of 1912 and went on to work as a Latin teacher before she married ophthalmologist Harry Johnston; at the time of her death, she was the university's oldest living graduate.

At age 98, Johnston moved from Iowa to Ohio in order to live with her daughter and son-in-law. Even after turning 110, she continued to be in good health, alert and engaging in conversations, and was still able to walk up steps. She became the oldest known living American in May 2004. Three months later, on the occasion of her 114th birthday, she was presented with a proclamation signed by then Drake University President David Maxwell. The university's Vice President for Institutional Advancement, John Willey, nominated her for an honorary degree. Johnston died in Worthington, Ohio, on December 1, 2004, at age 114 years and 117 days.

Bettie Wilson 
Bettie Antry Wilson (née Rutherford; September 13, 1890 – February 13, 2006) was the oldest resident of Mississippi ever recorded, and was considered the oldest living person in the United States from December 2004 until the subsequent verification of Elizabeth Bolden. Both were born in the rural South, where they lived less than 100 miles apart. Wilson was the daughter of freed slaves, Solomon and Delia Rutherford.

In April 2005, Wilson moved into a new home funded by donations, in New Albany. She celebrated her 115th birthday in September 2005, and died on February 13, 2006, aged 115 years, 153 days. She was survived by her son, five grandchildren, 46 great-grandchildren, 95 great-great-grandchildren and 38 great-great-great-grandchildren.

George Francis 
George Rene Francis (June 6, 1896 – December 27, 2008) was an American supercentenarian and the joint second-oldest living man in the world, together with Englishman Henry Allingham, also born on June 6, 1896, until Francis's death aged 112 years and 204 days. He was also the oldest living man in the United States, following the death of then 111-year-old Antonio Pierro on February 8, 2007. Francis was from New Orleans, Louisiana, but after 1949 lived in Sacramento, California, where a local newspaper published a poem that Francis enjoyed reciting to friends and the public throughout his life. He credited his longevity to nature, and enjoyed a rich diet of pork, eggs, milk and lard. He gave up smoking cigars at the age of 75.

Francis attempted to join the army in World War I, but was rejected for service in 1918 as being too short and small (he weighed only about ). Despite this, he later was a boxer before becoming a barber and then a chauffeur.

Bernice Madigan
Bernice Madigan (July 24, 1899 – January 3, 2015) was born in West Springfield, Massachusetts, and moved to Cheshire when she was six. In 1918, after graduating from Adams High School, she responded to government drives to recruit women into employment during WWI, and moved to Washington, D.C. After the war, she worked as a secretary for the Department of the Treasury and the Veterans Administration. She married Paul Madigan (d. 1976) in 1925; they lived in the Washington, D.C., area and then in Silver Spring, Maryland. She retired in 1942, after which she volunteered with the church and at nursing homes, playing piano for residents. She returned to live with family in Massachusetts in 2007. She participated in Boston University School of Medicine's New England Centenarian Study, and was interviewed and filmed by the Center for Aging at the University of Chicago and the ABC World News. She is one of 100 centenarians in The Archon Genomics XPRIZE. She joined social media, with profiles on Facebook and Twitter. Madigan died in her sleep at the age of 115 years and 163 days at 2 a.m. on January 3, 2015. At the time of her death, she was the oldest living resident of Massachusetts, the fourth-oldest living person in the United States and the world's fifth-oldest living person.

Evelyn Kozak
Eva Chavka Rivka "Evelyn" Kozak (née Jacobson) (August 14, 1899 – June 11, 2013) was an American Jewish supercentenarian, born in New York City to Isaac and Kate Jacobson, who fled from the Russian Empire, and the oldest verified Jewish person in history from November 6, 2012, 12 weeks after turning 113, when she broke fellow German-born American Adelheid Kirschbaum's record of 113 years and 83 days though until August 27, 2014, when fellow Russian-born American Goldie Steinberg (born October 30, 1900), who was the oldest living Jewish person after her death, broke her record.

Kozak died of a heart attack at a hospital in Brooklyn, New York City, early in the morning of Tuesday June 11, 2013 - barely around a quarter of a day before the oldest living person, 116-year-old Japaneseman Jiroemon Kimura (who died 2:08 a.m. the night of June 12 = 1:08 p.m. the afternoon of June 11 EDT). She survived two of her five children and had 10 grandchildren, 28 great-grandchildren and one great-great-grandson.

Notes

References 

 
American